Anthophila is a genus of moths in the family Choreutidae.

Species

Anthophila abhasica Danilevsky, 1969
Anthophila alpinella (Busck, 1904)
Anthophila armata Danilevsky, 1969
Anthophila bidzilyai Budashkin, 1997
Anthophila brachymorpha (Meyrick, 1915)
Anthophila colchica Danilevsky, 1969
Anthophila decolorana Danilevsky, 1969
Anthophila dischides Diakonoff, 1978
Anthophila fabriciana (Linnaeus, 1767)
Anthophila filipjevi Danilevsky, 1969
Anthophila latarniki Guillermet, 2010
Anthophila ludifica (Meyrick, 1914)
Anthophila massaicae Agassiz, 2008
Anthophila oreina Diakonoff, 1979
Anthophila threnodes (Walsingham, 1910)

Former species

Anthophila achyrodes   (Meyrick, 1912)
Anthophila equatoris (Walsingham, 1897)
Anthophila flavimaculata (Walsingham, 1891)
Anthophila fulminea   (Meyrick, 1912)
Anthophila ialeura (Meyrick, 1912)
Anthophila psilachyra   (Meyrick, 1912)
Anthophila submarginalis (Walker, 1865)
Anthophila torridula (Meyrick, 1926)
Anthophila turilega (Meyrick, 1924)

External links

 Choreutidae.lifedesks.org

Choreutidae
Taxa named by Adrian Hardy Haworth